Dronningmølle station (()) is a railway station serving the seaside resort town of Dronningmølle on the north coast of Zealand, Denmark.

The station is located on the Hornbæk Line from Helsingør to Gilleleje. The train services are currently operated by the railway company Lokaltog which runs frequent local train services between Helsingør station and Gilleleje station.

History 

The station opened in 1916 as the Helsingør-Hornbæk railway line from Helsingør along the coast of the Øresund to Hornbæk was continued from Hornbæk station onwards along the coast to Gilleleje.

See also
 List of railway stations in Denmark

External links

Lokaltog

Railway stations in the Capital Region of Denmark
Railway stations opened in 1916
Buildings and structures in Gribskov Municipality
Railway stations in Denmark opened in the 20th century